Mount Parker is the second-highest peak on Hong Kong Island, after Victoria Peak. It is the 40th-highest peak in the territory of Hong Kong.

Name 
It is named after Admiral of the Fleet Sir William Parker, 1st Baronet, of Shenstone.

Environment

Ecology 
A rare native tree, the Hong Kong camellia (Camellia hongkongensis), can be found growing on Mount Parker, while another species, Crapnell's camellia (Camellia crapnelliana), was first discovered on the peak.

Road Restrictions 
Much of the mountain is in a protected country park area.  The roads that go up this mountain are access-restricted.  Motorcycles, cars, bicycles, electric scooters without a special permit are not allowed on these roads, and the people who are caught may incur a penalty.

Gallery

References

See also 

 Kornhill
Quarry Bay
Tai Tam Country Park (Quarry Bay extension)
List of mountains, peaks and hills in Hong Kong
Geography of Hong Kong

Parker
Quarry Bay
Tai Tam
Eastern District, Hong Kong
Southern District, Hong Kong